Ulrike Müller may refer to:

 Ulrike Müller (artist) (born 1971), visual artist
 Ulrike Müller (politician) (born 1962), German politician